Pedro Manuel Ferreira Espinha (born 25 September 1965) is a Portuguese retired footballer who played as a goalkeeper.

Club career
Espinha was born in Mafra, Lisbon. During his career he played for C.D. Cova da Piedade, S.C.U. Torreense, Académica de Coimbra, S.G. Sacavenense, C.F. Os Belenenses, S.C. Salgueiros, Vitória de Guimarães, FC Porto– arriving at the Primeira Liga club at the ripe age of 35 and backing up legendary Vítor Baía during his two-year spell– and Vitória de Setúbal.

Espinha retired in June 2003, with a total of 249 Portuguese top-flight games to his credit.

International career
Espinha earned six caps for Portugal, including one at UEFA Euro 2000 against Germany in the group stage, keeping a clean sheet in the 3–0 win as the nation was already qualified and rested practically all its starting XI. From 2007 onwards, he worked as a goalkeeper coach with several youth categories of the national team.

Honours
Porto
Taça de Portugal: 2000–01
Supertaça Cândido de Oliveira: 2001

References

External links

1965 births
Living people
People from Mafra, Portugal
Portuguese footballers
Association football goalkeepers
Primeira Liga players
Liga Portugal 2 players
Segunda Divisão players
C.D. Cova da Piedade players
S.C.U. Torreense players
Associação Académica de Coimbra – O.A.F. players
C.F. Os Belenenses players
S.C. Salgueiros players
Vitória S.C. players
FC Porto players
FC Porto B players
Vitória F.C. players
Portugal international footballers
UEFA Euro 2000 players
Sportspeople from Lisbon District